Outspan may refer to:

, South African oranges marketed by Capespan, in the UK remembered for the use of specially-built orange shaped Minis
The Outspan, South African magazine 1927-1957  
Outspan Hotel, a hotel in Kenya